The 1994 Australian Sports Sedan Championship was a CAMS sanctioned motor racing title for drivers of Sports Sedans complying with Group 2D regulations. The title, which was the tenth Australian Sports Sedan Championship, was contested over two eight lap races held at the Sandown circuit in Victoria, Australia on 4 September 1994.

The championship was won by Brian Smith driving an Alfa Romeo Alfetta GTV Chevrolet.

Results

Note:
 There were thirty six entries for the championship
 There were thirty two starters.
 Only entries known to have started in at least one race are shown on the above table
 The precise method of determining final championship positions is not known

References

National Sports Sedan Series
Sports Sedan Championship